The RX-250-LPN  is an Indonesian sounding rocket, part of the RX rocket family. It was launched six times between 1987 and 2007.

Technical data
Specifications come from the rocket's summary datasheet published by Indonesian space agency LAPAN.
Apogee: 70 kilometres
Liftoff thrust: 53 kilonewtons
Burning time: 6 seconds
Specific impulse: 220 seconds
Propellant: HTPB
Total mass: 300 kilograms
Core diameter: 0.25 metres
Total length: 5.30 metres
Payload: 30–60 kg

References

Rockets and missiles
Space launch vehicles of Indonesia